is a Japanese politician who is a member of Liberal Democratic Party.

Career

Wakabayashi became the third Minister of Agriculture, Forestry and Fisheries appointed in Shinzō Abe's first cabinet after Toshikatsu Matsuoka killed himself as a result of financial scandal and Matsuoka's successor Norihiko Akagi resigned due to other financial scandals. He was appointed to the same position again in Abe's first reshuffled cabinet after Takehiko Endo's resignation.

After Abe's resignation, he worked under Yasuo Fukuda, who appointed Seiichi Ota his successor.

Resignation 
In March 2010  resigned from the Diet after being accused of pressing the voting button for fellow lawmaker Mikio Aoki, whose Diet seat was next to him, while Aoki was absent from a house plenary vote.

Honours
:
 Grand Cordon of the Order of the Rising Sun (July 2011)

References

External links 
  

1934 births
Living people
Politicians from Nagano Prefecture
Members of the House of Representatives (Japan)
Members of the House of Councillors (Japan)
Environment ministers of Japan
Government ministers of Japan
Liberal Democratic Party (Japan) politicians
University of Tokyo alumni